The 2010 season of the Moroccan Throne Cup was the 54th edition of the competition.

The cup was won by Fath Union Sport, who beat Maghreb de Fès in the final.

Preliminary rounds 
The preliminary rounds began in April 2010 and finished in August 2010. There were four rounds consisting of all teams from the amateur league, and teams from the second division of the professional league (from the 3rd round onwards).

4th round 
The fourth and final preliminary round took place between 7 and 9, and featured 32 teams from the 3rd and 2nd division of the Moroccan football championship:

Last 32 
The last 32 of the competition played between 13 and 19.

Final phases

Last 16 
The last 16 of the competition played between 5 and 15.

Quarter-finals 
The quarter finals took place on 8 and 10 October 2010.

Semi-finals 
The semi-finals took place on 6.

Final 

The final of the 2009–2010 Moroccan Throne Cup took place on 25 in Rabat.

Winner

Prize Fund 
 Total prize fund: 3.5 million MAD,
 Winner: 1.5 million MAD,
 Finalist (2nd place) : 1 million MAD,
 Semi-finalists (3rd and 4th places): 0.5 Million MAD each.

See also 

 2009–10 Botola

Notes and references

External links 
  Site of the FRMF
  Throne Cup news

2009
2009–10 in Moroccan football